Halenia weddelliana is a species of plant in the family Gentianaceae. Its natural habitat is subtropical or tropical high-altitude grassland.

Distribution
Colombia, Ecuador, Peru

References

External links
 

weddelliana
Flora of the Andes
Flora of Colombia
Flora of Ecuador
Flora of Peru